In Homer's Odyssey, Demoptolemus (Ancient Greek: Δημοπτόλεμος) was one of the myriad suitors of the queen of Ithaca, Penelope. He came from Dulichium along with other 56 wooers. Demoptolemus, with the other suitors, met his end by the spear of Odysseus in the final stages of the battle in the hall of the latter's palace.

See also
List of Greek mythological figures
Suitors of Penelope

Notes

References 

 Apollodorus, The Library with an English Translation by Sir James George Frazer, F.B.A., F.R.S. in 2 Volumes, Cambridge, MA, Harvard University Press; London, William Heinemann Ltd. 1921. ISBN 0-674-99135-4. Online version at the Perseus Digital Library. Greek text available from the same website.
Homer, The Odyssey with an English Translation by A.T. Murray, PH.D. in two volumes. Cambridge, MA., Harvard University Press; London, William Heinemann, Ltd. 1919. . Online version at the Perseus Digital Library. Greek text available from the same website.

Suitors of Penelope
Characters in the Odyssey